Florian Mayer was the defending champion but lost in the second round.
Radek Štěpánek defeated Jiří Veselý in an all-Czech final 6–4, 6–2 to capture the title.

Seeds

Draw

Finals

Top half

Bottom half

References
 Main Draw
 Qualifying Draw

2013 ATP Challenger Tour
2013 Singles